Ottis is a surname and masculine given name.  Notable people with the name Ottis include:

as a surname:
Brad Ottis (born 1972), American football player 

as a given name:
Ottis Anderson (born 1957), American football player
Ottis Gibson (born 1969), Barbadian cricketer and coach 
Ottis Steede (born 1974), Bermudian international footballer
Ottis Toole (1947–1996), American serial killer

See also
Otis (given name)
Otis (surname)
Otti (disambiguation)